Foula Airfield  is an airfield located on the remote island of Foula, part of the Shetland Islands in the north of Scotland.

History 
The airstrip opened in the 1970s and is run by the Foula Airstrip Trust, Scottish charity number SC021728. Foula is also served by a ferry service running three times a week but it is claimed that tourists prefer the short flight to the 135 minute ferry crossing. Also, the ferry is based on Foula, so a day trip to the island is only possible by air. The flights are used to transport essentials such as medical prescriptions to the island, which has a population of 38.

The airfield also provides the island's only public toilet and telephone.

Airline and destination 

Foula is served by a PSO service from Tingwall Airport run by Airtask Group and funded by Shetland Islands Council. The service uses a Britten Norman Islander aircraft and runs 7 times a week in winter and 13 times a week in summer, with a flying time of 15 minutes. Flights are heavily weather dependent due to fog and crosswind.

Accidents and incidents 
In June 2014 flights were suspended as it was believed that the airfield's insurance was not suitable following the closure of the island's fire station in 2012. Flights have since resumed.

References 

Airports in Shetland
Foula